Joel Lourie (born September 24, 1962) is a former Democratic member of the South Carolina Senate, representing the 22nd District from 2004 until 2017. He was previously a member of the South Carolina House of Representatives from 1998 through 2004.

He was born and raised in Columbia, South Carolina and is a 1980 graduate of Richland Northeast High School, a 1984 graduate of the University of South Carolina. His parents are the late Senator Isadore and Susan (Reiner) Lourie. He is married to Rebecca Baum, and has 2 children, Rachel and Sam. Lourie is Jewish.

Awards
2009 Champion of Health Care Award
2007 Star of Justice Award - Protection and Advocacy for People with Disabilities, Inc.
2006 Humane Society State Legislator Award
2006 Seat Belt Champion Award from the Meharry-State Farm Alliance
2006 State Safety Leadership Award from the National Transportation Safety Board
2004 Legislative Award from the South Carolina Counseling Association
2004 Advocate Award from the South Carolina School Improvement Council
2002 Advocate Award from the National Alliance for the Mentally Ill
2004 and 2006 Legislative Appreciation Awards from South Carolina Victims Assistance Network
2003 Legislator of the Year Award for the National Association of Social Workers
2000 Alliance for South Carolina's Child Advocacy Leadership Award
2000 Senior Advocacy Award from Senior Resources
2000 South Carolina Department of Health and Environmental Control Legislator of the Year Award
2000 Distinguished Service Award from the South Carolina Association of Non-Profit Organizations
2010 Commitment Award from the National Safety Council Alive At 25 Program
2011 Legislator of the Year from the South Carolina Recreation and Parks Association
2011 Recognition Award from the March of Dimes

References

External links
South Carolina Legislature - Senator Joel Lourie official SC Senate website
Our Campaigns – Senator Joel Lourie (SC) profile
Project Vote Smart - Senator Joel Lourie (SC) profile
Follow the Money - Joel B Lourie
2006 2004 2002 2000 1998 campaign contributions

1962 births
Living people
South Carolina state senators
Jewish American people in South Carolina politics
Members of the South Carolina House of Representatives
21st-century American Jews
21st-century American politicians